Titan Advisors is an American asset management firm.

History
The firm was founded in 1992 by George Fox. In 2015 Titan Advisors merged with Saguenay Strathmore Capital. It is headquartered in Stamford, Connecticut.

In 2016, it had approximately US$5 billion under management.

References

Investment management companies of the United States
Financial services companies established in 1992
Companies based in Stamford, Connecticut